The Hewa are an indigenous people that live in the Koroba Lake Kopiago Electorate of Hela Province of Papua New Guinea near the junction of the Strickland River. They were one of the last peoples in Papua New Guinea to come into contact with the outside world. Their language belongs to the Sepik family.

They hunt birds, reptiles and mammals for food, adornment and trade with neighboring tribes. Having learned that fruit- and nectar-eating birds, such as fruit-doves and lorikeets, are vital to forest regeneration, the Hewa slash small gardens out of the dense jungle and allow about 20 – 25 years for the tilled yet unseeded land to be reforested naturally. Their language is not related to any outside the general area and their culture is unlike that of the other Southern Highlands tribes. They have some limited trade with those neighboring tribes, exchanging the Hewa's animal skins, spears and nose rings for shells and boars. They make paintings on flat sheets of bark but these paintings, done for magical purposes, are never traded or exhibited.

They are one of the few tribes in the fringe highland area never to have practised cannibalism, perhaps because their belief associates cannibalism with dangerous sorcerers.<ref>[https://books.google.com/books?id=X7kn904Mzn4C&dq=Hewa+witches&pg=PA71 Humors and Substances by P.J. Stewart, page 71]</ref> It is not uncommon for women accused of witchcraft to be killed. The Hewa have been extensively studied by anthropologists Lyle Steadman and William H. Thomas. The Hewa were also featured on the final episode of the Discovery Channel program Survivorman and in a later program called Beyond Survival''.

The Hewa were one of the last peoples in Papua New Guinea to come into contact with the outside world. Many Hewa people north of the Lagaip River were uncontacted until 1975, when the Officer in Charge at Kopiago braved arrow attacks and led what probably was Papua New Guinea's last "first contact patrol", bringing steel axeheads to an area where stone axeheads were the norm. Even south of the Lagaip, many Hewa families were first contacted by Steadman in the late 1960s. He found that the typical family (which averaged seven people) lived in relative isolation from other families, with their nearest neighbors living half a mile away through dense jungle. After darkness envelops their isolated realm, the families often stay awake for hours, the men telling myths and stories around a fire, and the women, gathered around a separate fire in their section of the house, often interrupting with well-timed quips and jests. Sometimes, historical tales are sung or chanted.

In recent decades, change has come to the region. Many Hewa wear Western clothes instead of the traditional grass skirts; though the majority still live in scattered households, many now live in villages and travel agencies fly tourists to newly constructed airstrips to visit them.

Notes

Indigenous peoples of Melanesia
Ethnic groups in Papua New Guinea